State Road 584 (SR 584), locally known as Tampa Road, is a two-mile-long street connecting Curlew Road (SR 586) and SR 580 in Oldsmar, Florida. A western continuation along Tampa Road (along current CR 752, formerly a section of SR 584) extends six miles (10 km) until its intersection with Alternate US 19-SR 595 near Ozona and one mile (1.6 km) north of Dunedin.  At the eastern terminus of SR 584, Tampa Road becomes SR 580 and Hillsborough Avenue, a major highway serving Tampa International Airport in Hillsborough County.

Route description
SR 584 begins at an intersection with SR 586 and CR 752 in Oldsmar, heading southeast as Tampa Road, a six-lane divided highway. CR 752 continues northwest on Tampa Road past this intersection. From the western terminus, the road passes through a mix of residential areas and businesses, crossing CR 667. SR 584 continues past more development before it crosses a CSX railroad line and ends at SR 580. Past this intersection, SR 580 continues along Tampa Road.

Major intersections

References

External links

584
584